Tissue culture is the growth of tissues or cells in an artificial medium separate from the parent organism. This technique is also called micropropagation. This is typically facilitated via use of a liquid, semi-solid, or solid growth medium, such as broth or agar. Tissue culture commonly refers to the culture of animal cells and tissues, with the more specific term plant tissue culture being used for plants. The term "tissue culture" was coined by American pathologist Montrose Thomas Burrows.This is possible only in certain conditions.  It also requires more attention. It can be done only in genetic labs with various chemicals.

Historical use 

In 1885 Wilhelm Roux removed a section of the medullary plate of an embryonic chicken and maintained it in a warm saline solution for several days, establishing the basic principle of tissue culture.  In 1907 the zoologist Ross Granville Harrison demonstrated the growth of frog embryonic cells that would give rise to nerve cells in a medium of clotted lymph.  In 1913, E. Steinhardt, C. Israeli, and R. A. Lambert grew vaccinia virus in fragments of guinea pig corneal tissue. In 1996, the first use of regenerative tissue was used to replace a small length of urethra, which led to the understanding that the technique of obtaining samples of tissue, growing it outside the body without a scaffold, and reapplying it, can be used for only small distances of less than 1 cm.

Gottlieb Haberlandt first pointed out the possibilities of the culture of isolated tissues, plant tissue culture. He suggested that the potentialities of individual cells via tissue culture as well as that the reciprocal influences of tissues on one another could be determined by this method. Since Haberlandt's original assertions, methods for tissue and cell culture have been realized, leading to significant discoveries in biology and medicine. His original idea, presented in 1902, was called totipotentiality: “Theoretically all plant cells are able to give rise to a complete plant.”

Modern usage

In modern usage, "Tissue culture" generally refers to the growth of cells from a multicellular organism in vitro. These cells may be cells isolated from a donor organism (primary cells) or an immortalised cell line. The cells are bathed in a culture medium, which contains essential nutrients and energy sources necessary for the cells' survival. Thus, in its broader sense, "tissue culture" is often used interchangeably with "cell culture". On the other hand, the strict meaning of "tissue culture" refers to the culturing of tissue pieces, i.e. explant culture.

Tissue culture is an important tool for the study of the biology of cells from multicellular organisms. It provides an in vitro model of the tissue in a well defined environment which can be easily manipulated and analysed. In animal tissue culture, cells may be grown as two-dimensional monolayers (conventional culture) or within fibrous scaffolds or gels to attain more naturalistic three-dimensional tissue-like structures (3D culture). Eric Simon, in a 1988 NIH SBIR grant report, showed that electrospinning could be used to produced nano- and submicron-scale polymeric fibrous scaffolds specifically intended for use as in vitro cell and tissue substrates. This early use of electrospun fibrous lattices for cell culture and tissue engineering showed that various cell types would adhere to and proliferate upon polycarbonate fibers. It was noted that as opposed to the flattened morphology typically seen in 2D culture, cells grown on the electrospun fibers exhibited a more rounded 3-dimensional morphology generally observed of tissues in vivo.

Plant tissue culture in particular is concerned with the growing of entire plants from small pieces of plant tissue, cultured in medium.The technique of plant tissue culture, i.e., culturing plant cells or tissues in artificial medium supplemented with required nutrients, has many applications in efficient clonal propagation (true to the type or similar) which may be difficult via conventional breeding methods. Tissue culture is used in creating genetically modified plants, as it allows scientists to introduce DNA changes to plant tissue via Agrobacterium tumefaciens or a gene gun and then generate a full plant from these modified cells.

Because plant cells are totipotent, adding growth hormones to the media can trigger the callus cells to develop roots, shoots and entire plants.

Animal tissue culture 
There are three common methods to establish cell culture from animals. The first is organ culture where whole organs from embryos or partial adult organs are used to initiate the organ culture in vitro. These cells retain their differentiated character and functional activity in organ culture. The second method is primary explant culture, in which fragments derived from animal tissue are attached to a surface using an extracellular matrix component (ECM), such as collagen or a plasma clot. This culture is known as a primary explant, and migrating cells are known as outgrowth. This has been used to analyze the growth characteristics of cancer cells in comparison to their normal counterparts.The third method is cell culture, of which there are three types: (1) precursor cell culture, i.e. undifferentiated cells that are to be differentiate, (2) differentiated cell culture, i.e. completely differentiated cells that have lost the capacity to further differentiate, and (3) stem cell culture, i.e. undifferentiated cells that can develop into any kind of cell.”

Applications of animal cell culture 
Animal cell culture is used for many research purposes and commercial business also as: 

 Vaccine production 
 Monoclonal antibody production 
 Enzymes and hormones production 
 In vitro skin and other tissues and organs by stem culturing 
 Viral cultivation

Establishing a cell line 
A cell line can be defined as a permanently established cell culture which will propagate forever. Investigators mostly get cell lines from other investigators or from the cell bank as The (American Type Culture Collection) , because its much easier than creating new one but in special cases investigators are obligated to establish a cell line to do this you must use one of the folowing cells:

Transformed cell lines, Tumor tissue or Transforming normal cell in vitro

Subculture 
Subculture is the transfer of cells from one culture to start a new one. During this process the proliferating cells are subdivided, to form a new cell lines.

Stem cell technology 
The most advanced tissue culture science is now focused on stem cells, stem cells can be used for tissue replacement or either organs. stem cell is a primitive type of cell which has the ability to diffrentiate to all the 220 cell types found in human body. stem cells can be obtained from blood, brain, or muscle tissue but the most important one is from early embryos which has the capability to differentiate to any other cell.

See also 
 Cell culture
 Organ culture
 Microphysiometry
 Plant tissue culture

References

Histology
Laboratory techniques
Cell culture